The Ministry for the Economy, Development, and Tourism is a Chilean state ministry in charge of planning and executing the flow of policies and projects of the Chilean government. The ministry aims to generate feasible and sustainable economic development, with stable progressive equality in the allocation of economic interests. The current Minister of Economy, Development, and Tourism is Nicolás Grau.

History 
The groundwork for the ministry were established in the 1930s—a period that saw the creation of the Subsecretary of Commerce that was dependent on the Ministry of Foreign Relations of that era. But the actual ministry itself was realized in October 1941 as Ministry of Commerce and Supply, and by 1942 it was ratified as the Ministry of Economy and Commerce. Subsequently, it was renamed to Ministry of Economy (1953–1960), and hitherto the Ministry of Economy, Development, and Reconstruction.

Structure 

The Ministry for the Economy, Development, and Reconstruction is divided into three organizations headed by sub-secretaries:
Economy Under-Secretariat
Fisheries Under-Secretariat
Tourism Under-Secretariat

Government organisations related to, dependent, or under supervision of the Ministry of Economy, Development, and Reconstruction include:
 Servicio Nacional de Pesca (SERNAPESCA)
 Servicio Nacional de Turismo(SERNATUR)
 Servicio Nacional del Consumidor (SERNAC)
 Superintendencia de Electricidad y Combustibles (SEC)
 Millennium Science Initiative
 Instituto Nacional de Estadísticas de Chile (INE)
 Fiscalía Nacional Económica (FNE)
 Comité de Inversiones Extranjeras
 Empresa de Abastecimiento de Zonas Aisladas (EMAZA)
 Sistema de Empresas Públicas (SEP)
 Corporación de Fomento de la Producción (CORFO)
 Comité de Inversiones Extranjeras CINVER

External links 
  
 Chilean government economy website 

Chile
Economy of Chile
Economy, Development and Tourism
Chile, Economy, Development and Tourism
Chile
1941 establishments in Chile